Quintus is a male given name derived from Quintus, a common Latin forename (praenomen) found in the culture of ancient Rome. Quintus derives from Latin word quintus, meaning "fifth".

Quintus is an English masculine given name and a surname. Quintus has been translated into Italian, Spanish and Portuguese, as Quinto.

In other languages

Derived surnames

See also
 

English-language masculine given names
Latin masculine given names
Latin-language surnames
Patronymic surnames
Masculine given names
Surnames

it:Quinto
nl:Quintus
pl:Kwintus